The 1987–88 Campionato Sammarinese di Calcio season was the 3rd season since its establishment. It was contested by 10 teams, and S.P. Tre Fiori won the championship.

Regular season

Championship playoff

Results

First round
A.C. Libertas 5-1 S.S. Virtus
S.C. Faetano 0-0 (pen 6-7)  S.S. San Giovanni

Second round
S.S. Virtus 4-3 S.C. Faetano
A.C. Libertas 3-2 S.S. San Giovanni

Third round
S.S. Virtus 1-0 S.S. San Giovanni
S.S. Folgore/Falciano 1-1 (pen4-5) A.C. Libertas

Fourth round
S.S. Folgore/Falciano 1-2 S.S. Virtus
S.P. Tre Fiori 2-0 A.C. Libertas

Semifinal
A.C. Libertas 0-0 (pen 7-8) S.S. Virtus

Final
S.P. Tre Fiori 3-3 (pen6-5) S.S. Virtus

Bracket

Libertas play runners-up Folgore as Game D winners.
San Giovanni and Virtus play each other as Game D losers and Game C winners, respectively.
Faetano is eliminated with two losses.

References
San Marino - List of final tables (RSSSF)

Campionato Sammarinese di Calcio
San
Campionato